This is a list of American police officers killed in 2010.

List

See also 

Law enforcement in the United States

Other nations 
List of Australian Federal Police killed in the line of duty
List of British police officers killed in the line of duty
List of Irish police officers killed in the line of duty
List of New Zealand police officers killed in the line of duty

References

External links 
 Officer Down Memorial Page (ODMP)

 
Death in the United States-related lists
United States crime-related lists
Lists of police officers killed in the line of duty
2010 in the United States